Ischnocampa tolimensis is a moth of the family Erebidae. It was described by Walter Rothschild in 1916. It is found in Colombia.

References

Ischnocampa
Moths described in 1916